Freddy Augdal Wike (born 10 January 1976) is a Norwegian Jazz musician (drums).

Career 
Wike played with Frøy Aagre on her three albums Katalyze (2004), Countryside (2006) and Cycle Of Silence (2010). His first recording Paralooped; Jennie Jones Part III (2001), was within D:Koder. He has also collaborated with Torbjørn Sletta Jacobsen Quintet at Oslo Jazzfestival in 2013.

Personal life
Wike was born in Lillehammer but now lives in Oslo, and has been married since 14 May 2005 to Thea Wike (b. 1979).

Discography 

With D:Koder
2001: Paralooped; Jennie Jones Part III (Mercury Records)

With Frøy Aagre Offbeat
2004: Katalyze (Aim Records)
2006: Countryside (Aim Records)

With Kristin Sevaldsen Band
2007: Impressions (D'Label)
 
With Frøy Aagre
2010: Cycle Of Silence (ATC Records)

References

External links

1976 births
Musicians from Lillehammer
Living people
20th-century Norwegian drummers
21st-century Norwegian drummers
Norwegian jazz drummers
Male drummers
Norwegian jazz composers
20th-century drummers
Male jazz composers
20th-century Norwegian male musicians
21st-century Norwegian male musicians